Yang Yiqing (24 December 1454 – 5 September 1530), courtesy name Yingning (應寧), pseudonym Sui'an (邃庵) or Shizong (石淙), was a Chinese scholar-official of the Ming dynasty.

History 
Yang's ancestral home was located in Yunnan, Yiqing followed his father Jing to Yuezhou, since the latter moved to there in 1460. He was considered a child prodigy at the age of six, and given a privilege to enter the Hanlin Academy for studying. He passed the metropolitan examination of 1468, and the palace examination of 1472 later. He settled in Dantu, where his father was buried, in the next year. After his mourning, he served as a drafter in the Grand Secretariat since 1476, then assistant surveillance commissioner of Shanxi some year later. He was appointed as commissioner of education in Shaanxi, and had been conversant with the frontier affairs the eight-year term expired.

Yang held the posts of vice minister of the Court of Imperial Sacrifices, then minister of its counterpart in Nanjing successively. He became vice censor-in-chief and attended to Shaanxi to supervise imperial horse ranches. When Dayan Khan assaulted the frontier, Yang assumed the responsibility of the governor of Shaanxi. He submitted his suggestion to renovate the Great Wall around Ordos, which was approved later. 

He was a colleague of Liu Jin. On the pretext of corruption, he was imprisoned until being rescued by and Wang Jin, but had to leave his job then.

When the Prince of Anhua revolted in 1510, the Zhengde Emperor summoned Yang and delegated him to suppress the revolt with a eunuch Zhang Yong. He used the contradictions between Zhang and Liu to remove the latter. He was promoted to the minister of revenue in autumn of the year and gained the title of the junior protector of the heir apparent. Liu Jin was executed prior to his promotion. He was moved sideways, as the minister of Personnel several months later. He gained the title of the Junior Mentor in 1514. He took over as the Chief Grand Secretary, when Yang Tinghe was obliged to leave for mourning in 1515. He blamed the anomalies emerged recently to the incompetent administration in 1516, which annoyed officials Qian Ning and Jiang Bin who were satirized. They undermined Yang, thus the latter resigned returned to Dantu. Still, the emperor favored Yang, he stayed at Yang's home for two days, on his inspection to the southern.

Yang was appointed as the supreme commander of the three frontiers of Shaanxi in 1525, which set a precedent for appointing the retired grand secretary as the frontier supreme commander. Prior to enthroning, the Jiajing Emperor had admired Yang, who endorsed Zhang Cong's actions in the Great Rites Controversy. Thus the latter gained the title of Junior Preceptor. Yang became the Chief Grand Secretary again in 1527. Suffered factional strifes, he left in later 1529. His titles and privilege were deprived, with Cong's accusation. Then he died in the autumn of 1530. The court restored his titles in 1548, besides, he was given the posthumous title "Wenxiang".

Yang and Wang Shouren were close friends supposedly. Yang wrote the tombstone epitaph for Wang's father and endeavored to free imprisoned Wang, meanwhile Wang prefaced for Yang's collection, he also felt compassion when Yang was marginalized in the reign of Jiajing.

References 

Senior Grand Secretaries of the Ming dynasty
1454 births
1530 deaths